Fernando Vázquez (born 1954) is a Spanish footballer.

Fernando Vázquez may also refer to:
 Fernando Vázquez de Arce (?–1520), Bishop of Islas Canarias
 Fernando Vázquez de Menchaca (1512–1569), Spanish jurist
 Fernando Vásquez (born 1962), Bolivian mining minister
 Fernando Vázquez (athlete) (born 1971), Spanish racewalker
 Fernando "Fer" Vázquez (born 1994), Uruguayan singer
 Fernando Vázquez (footballer, born 1999), Mexican footballer